Southend Victoria railway station is the eastern terminus of the Shenfield to Southend Line in the East of England, a branch off the Great Eastern Main Line, and is one of the primary stations serving the resort city of Southend-on-Sea, Essex (the other is Southend Central  on the London, Tilbury and Southend line). The Engineer's Line Reference for the line is SSV; the station's three-letter station code is SOV. The station has four platforms each with an operational length for 12-coach trains.

History 
The line from Wickford to Southend including this station was opened on 1 October 1889. There was a goods yard to the east of the station; it closed on 5 June 1967. The station area still has extensive carriage sidings: Down Carriage Sidings (North) 10 roads (known as The Klondyke sidings); Down Carriage Sidings (South) 3 roads plus a disused Royal Mail Terminal; Up Carriage Sidings (North) 3 roads (known as The Shute); Up Carriage Sidings (South) 2 roads.

Electrification of the Shenfield to Southend Victoria line using 1.5 kV DC overhead line electrification (OLE) was completed on 31 December 1956. This was changed to 6.25 kV AC in November 1960 and to 25 kV AC on 25 January 1979.

The station was named Southend for Westcliffe & Thorpe Bay from 1933 to 1949; from 1 May 1949 it was renamed Southend-on-Sea Victoria; and from 20 February 1969 it was finally changed to Southend Victoria.

Services 
It is currently managed by Greater Anglia, which also operates all trains serving it. The typical Monday to Saturday off-peak service is of three trains per hour to Liverpool Street (the services join the Great Eastern Main Line for London at the western terminus of ). On Sundays there are typically two trains per hour to Liverpool Street.

References

External links

Railway stations in Essex
DfT Category C1 stations
Railway stations in Southend-on-Sea
Former Great Eastern Railway stations
Greater Anglia franchise railway stations
William Neville Ashbee railway stations
Railway stations in Great Britain opened in 1889
Buildings and structures in Southend-on-Sea